The Lindenwood Lady Lions represent Lindenwood University. The 2011–12 Lindenwood Lady Lions ice hockey season was the team's 9th season and their 1st season as a member of the National Collegiate Athletic Association (NCAA). The team was coached by Vince O'Mara and they played their home games at Lindenwood Ice Arena. For the 2011–12 season, Lindenwood competed as an NCAA Division I independent program.

Offseason
 July 2011: Lindenwood announced the 2011-12 schedule as the program's first season of NCAA competition as part of the university's transition from NAIA to NCAA. seven games against NCAA Division III; and five games against former ACHA Division I rivals Robert Morris (IL) and Grand Valley State
September 14: Lindenwood officially submitted an application to join College Hockey America (CHA) for the 2012–2013 season.

Recruiting
Lindenwood announced its first NCAA recruiting class on July 6, 2011. The 2011-12 recruiting class includes 12 incoming freshman:

Regular season

News and notes 
 September 23: Lindenwood played its first official NCAA contest against #1 ranked and defending champions Wisconsin. Lindenwood held the Badgers to one goal in the first period before the Badgers added a goal early in the second then added six goals in the final half of the second period. Wisconsin outshot Lindenwood 60 to 11. Freshman goaltender, Taylor Fairchild made 49 saves for LU.
September 30: The Lady Lions nearly earned its first NCAA Division I win versus the MSU-Mankato Mavericks. The Lady Lions fought back from a two-goal deficit with two third-period goals. A late goal by Kathleen Rogan gave Minnesota State a 4–3 lead, which they would not relinquish. At 5:24 in the second period. Less than a minute later, Kendra Broad scored the first goal in Lindenwood's NCAA history unassisted. Minnesota State outshot the Lady Lions 53–16, as Lady Lions goaltender Taylor Fairchild made 49 saves.
 October 27–28: The series versus the Mercyhurst Lakers program marked the first time that the Lindenwood Lady Lions hosted an NCAA Division I opponent in their home arena.
 November 4: The program picked up its first win as an NCAA program, 7–1, over Division III opponent, Saint Benedict.
 November 10: Lindenwood lost to Bemidji State 0–11 in the U.S. Hockey Hall of Fame Face-Off Classic, held in Eveleth, Minnesota.
 November 11: Lindenwood was admitted into College Hockey America on November 11, 2011 and will begin conference play starting in the 2012–13 season along with Penn State, bringing the CHA's membership to six members.
 November 12–13: Robert Morris (PA) sweeps Lindenwood in the programs second home series against a Division I team by the combined score of 2-12.
 December 3: The Lady Lions record their first overtime game against a Division I opponent when the team lost to Syracuse, 1–2 in the fourth minute of overtime on December 5, 2011. Freshman goaltender, Taylor Fairchild stopped 45 of 47 shots in the match.
 January 4, 2012: Lindenwood returned from winter break on January 4, 2012 and set a season high for most goals allowed in a 0–14 loss to sixth-ranked North Dakota. The Sioux outshot LU 62–15.
 January 7, 2012: Freshman forward, Alison Wickenheiser scored five goals to help LU to a 6–1 victory against Concordia (MN).
 January 14–21:  Lindenwood set a season high win streak with four straight wins. The streak included Lindenwood's first win against an NCAA Division I opponent and first shutout of an NCAA Division I opponent with a 4–0 win over Sacred Heart on January 20. Junior forward, Sarah Oliphant scored the game-winning goal 82 seconds into the game while freshman goaltender, Taylor Fairchild made 25 saves to record her first collegiate shutout. Lindenwood held Sacred Heart scoreless on six power-play opportunities. Lindenwood earned its first series sweep of the season and first sweep in program history over an NCAA Division I opponent on January 21 with a 5–2 win against Sacred Heart. Freshman goaltender, Briar Bache recorded her second win of the season and first over a Division I opponent.
 January 28–30:  Lindenwood played a three-game exhibition series against Robert Morris University- Chicago. The exhibition series paired the Lions up with the #3 ranked team in the ACHA Division I and former NAIA and ACHA rival of the Lady Lions.  Although Robert Morris scored the first goal in the series opener, Lindenwood tied the game before the end of the first period with a goal by Kelsey Talbot. LU then scored two goals in the second and one goal in the third period to finish the game 4–1. Lindenwood outshot Robert Morris by a 58-19 margin in the opening game with freshman goaltender, Taylor Fairchild recording the exhibition win with 18 saves. In the second game of the series, sophomore forward, Allysson Arcibal recorded two goals with freshmen Alyssa West and Alison Wickenheiser each scoring a goal while sophomore goaltender, Briar Bache made 18 saves to win the second game of the exhibition series 4–1. Lindenwood outshot RMU(IL) by a 73-19 margin. The game also marked senior night for the 2011–12 season, in which Lindenwood celebrated senior night for the team's lone senior, defenseman Kendra Ganchar. In the final game of the series six different players recorded goals and freshmen goaltender, Taylor Fairchild made 13 saves to help LU to a 6–0 shutout of RMU.
 February 10–11: Lindenwood concluded its inaugural NCAA season on the road at Saint Michael's College. In the opening game Lindenwood jumped out to a 3–1 lead by the end of the first period. Saint Mike's outscored the Lady Lions 2–1 in both the second and third periods; taking the lead in the third period. Freshman forward, Jordyn Constance, scored with eight seconds remaining in regulation to tie the game 5-5, sending the game into overtime. In overtime, Alison Wickenheiser scored a power-play goal to give Lindenwood its first overtime win against an NCAA team and preserve the Lady Lions' winning streak. Wickenheiser's goal was her third of the game second hat trick in two games. In the final game of the season, Lindenwood scored four goals in the first period and three goals in the second to take a seven-goal lead into the final period. The Purple Knights broke the shutout early in the third period but Lindenwood answered held off a comeback attempt scoring two goals in the final period. The Lady Lions ended the game scoring a season-high nine goals and outshooting Saint Michael's 53–12 in the 9–1 win. Lindenwood finished the season on a season high six game win streak and won eight NCAA games overall. In addition Lindenwood swept its exhibition series against rival Robert Morris Illinois. Lindenwood's exhibition series against Grand Valley State scheduled for February 17 and 18 was cancelled.

Lindenwood Statistics Nationally
Lindenwood University Statistics

Rankings 
Lindenwood University Rankings

Schedule

 Note: ^ Denotes an exhibition game.

Players

2011-12 Roster 
As of September 8, 2011.

Awards and honors

References

Lindenwood
2011-12 Lindenwood Lady Lions women's ice hockey season
Lindenwood
Lindenwood